The following lists events in the year 2019 in Guatemala.

Incumbents
President: Jimmy Morales
Vice-President: Jafeth Cabrera

Events
28 March – At least 18 killed when a truck crashes into a crowd along the Pan-American Highway in Nahualá, Solola
16 June – Scheduled date for the 2019 Guatemalan general election
11 August – Alejandro Giammattei wins the second round of the presidential elections with 58% of the vote, defeating Sandra Torres, wife of the current president.

Deaths

10 January – Juan Francisco Reyes, politician, Vice President (b. 1938).
28 January – Humberto Ak'ab'al, poet (b. 1952).
13 April – Rodolfo Francisco Bobadilla Mata, Roman Catholic prelate, Bishop of Huehuetenango (b. 1932).
14 May – Wilmer Josue Ramirez Vasquez, 2, Guatemalan refugee who died while in the custody of U.S. Immigration and Customs Enforcement in El Paso, Texas; multiple intestinal and respiratory infectious diseases
25 September – Michael Coe, 90, American archaeologist and anthropologist who worked in Guatemala and Mexico (b. 1929)
1 November – Rina Lazo, 93, muralist (Fertile Earth), painter, and activist in Guatemala (Order of the Quetzal, 2004) and Mexico (b. Guatemala City, 1923)

See also
 	

 		
 2019 Pan American Games

References

Links
 

 
2010s in Guatemala
Years of the 21st century in Guatemala
Guatemala
Guatemala